Eugeniusz Rudnik (28 October 1932 – 24 October 2016) was a modern Polish composer,
electronics engineer and sound engineer and a pioneer of electronic and electro-acoustic music in Poland.

Early life
Rudnik was born on 28 October 1932 in Nadkole.

In 1967 he graduated from the Faculty of Electronics on Warsaw University of Technology. From 1955 he worked for Polish Radio, at first as the manager of plumbers, carpenters and painters.

Career

In 1958 Rudnik started working in the Experimental Studio of the Polish Radio, fourth such facility in Europe, founded and directed by Józef Patkowski. Between 1967 and 1968, he worked in the Studio for Electronic Music of the Westdeutscher Rundfunk in Cologne, when
he cooperated with Włodzimierz Kotoński by the implementation of Klangspiele. In the late 1960s and 1970s Rudnik co-
created some of Norwegian composer Arne Nordheim's works, including "Colorazione" and "Solitaire" (1969).

Rudnik was one of the first Polish electroacoustic music producers and co-founder of the so-called Polish school of electroacoustic music and author of innovative solutions of spatial sound projection, composer of Skalary (1966). He was also author of the one of the first in the world poliversional tracks to tape, and the first Polish track quadraphonic Vox Humana (1968) carried out in Studio WDR in Cologne. His work has defined and confirmed the role of sound producer as a co-author of the
works of electroacoustic music.

As a composer Rudnik created almost 100 works in studios of electronic music in Warsaw, Stockholm, Cologne, Paris, Bourges, Baden-Baden, Brussels and Ghent. They were presented on different radio stations throughout Europe and in many countries, as well as at many festivals in Warsaw, Wrocław, Finland, Zagreb, Stockholm, Berlin, Paris, Arles, and other sites. In 2006, he was a central figure in Warsaw edition of Audio Art Festival. His composition Homo Ludens was presented in 1985 at the prestigious world exhibition of contemporary art Documenta VII
in Kassel.

Awards and honours

He won many awards. In addition to the ones already mentioned, they include one at the First International Electronic Music Competition for "Dixi" (1968), 1st prize at the Bourges International Electroacoustic Music Competition (France) for Mobile (1972), 3rd prize in Bourges for Ostinato (1973), 2nd prize in Bourges for Homo Ludens (1984).

He was named Chairman of the Committee on Radio and Television "for his outstanding achievements in the field of creativity and execution of experimental electronic music for programs of Polish Radio and Television". He received the Warsaw Golden Badge of Honour for services to Warsaw (1987), an honorary radio award at the Festiwal Mediów "Człowiek w zagrożeniu" in Łódź for the "eternal and universal values of the human being documenting the threats of modern civilization" (1991), the Euphonia d'or prize in Bourges, also for Mobile, the Golden Microphone Award for "valued worldwide achievements in the field of radio art and experimental autonomous music" (1993) and the first prize (shared with Maria Brzezińska) at the XVII Międzynarodowy Katolicki Festiwal Filmów i Multimediów in Niepokalanów, and at the "Dwa Teatry" festival in Gdańsk for Przyjaciółki z Żelaznej ulicy (2002).

In 2000 he was awarded the Knight's Cross of the Order of Polonia Restituta. On 27 October 2012, at the Soundedit Festival, Rudnik received Człowiek ze Złotym Uchem award for "pioneering work in the field of music production". He died on 24 October 2016, four days before his 84th birthday.

Autonomous pieces of art
 1965–Kolaż
 1965–Korzeń
 1965–Lekcja
 1966–Skalary – studium technologiczne
 1967–Dixi
 1968–Metamorfoza – muzyka ilustracyjna
 1968–Vox Humana
 1969–Rondo
 1970–My
 1971–Divertimento
 1972–Mobile
 1972–Mobile (wersja czterokanałowa)
 1973–Ostinato
 1973–Ready made
 1973–Wokale
 1974–Etiuda monotematyczna
 1974–Muzyka baletowa
 1974–Nature morte avec l’oiseau (wersja czterokanałowa)
 1974–Nature morte avec l'oiseau
 1974–Ostinato (wersja czterokanałowa)
 1974–Ring
 1974–Ring II
 1975–Gołębie Warszawy (nagranie czterokanałowe)
 1975–Nokturn
 1976–Cztery poematy
 1977–Ready made'77
 1978–Polak melduje z kosmosu
 1979–Etude de l'aspirine parisienne
 1979–Moulin diabolique
 1979–My
 1979–Nous
 1979–Omagio all'anonimo
 1980–Tryptyk – pamięci Franco Ewangelisty
 1982–Berceuse
 1982–Elegia – ofiarom wojny
 1982–Elegy to the victims of the war
 1984–Ekecheiria – szkic do portretu Mistrza
 1984–Homo ludens – balet radiowy nie pozbawiony elementów autobiografii
 1984–Kamienne epitafium – pamięci księdza Jerzego Popiełuszki
 1984–Szkic do portretu Mistrza
 1986–Podzwonne – pamięci Andrzeja Markowskiego
 1989–Gilotyna – dg
 1990–Annus miraculi
 1990–Via crucis – epitafium poświęcone pamięci polskich oficerów zamordowanych w kwietniu i maju 1940 przez NKWD i pogrzebanych we wsi Katyń koło Smoleńska
 1992–Pan Jezus niewierzących
 1992–Ptacy i ludzie  – etiuda koncertowa na czworo artystów, troje skrzypiec, dwa słowiki, nożyczki i garncarkę ludową
 1994–Panichida – pamięci Jerzego Bienieckiego
 1995–Annus mirabilis
 1995–Diewuszka, wasze dokumienty
 1995–Interludia
 1995–Przyjaciółki z Żelaznej ulicy – radiowa ballada dokumentalna
 1995–Sekunda wielka – mała suita dokumentalna dla dorosłych
 1995–Theme G-M-E-B
 1997–Divertimento
 1997–Martwa natura z ptakiem, zegarem, strzelcem i panną
 1997–Pourqoi Cocteau – epitafium na śmierć Wielkiego Aktora George'a Genicot
 1997–Rumor
 1998–Homo radiophonicus – radiowa ballada dokumentalna
 1999–Jesień Ludów
 1999–Peregrynacje Pana Podchorążego albo nadwiślańskie żarna – radiowa ballada dokumentalna
 2001–Die Wandlung des Herrn Fahnrich oder die Muhisteine an der Weichsel -Eine dokumentarische mehrspachige Rundfunk Ballade
 2002–Śniadanie na trawie w grocie Lascaux
 2004–Agonia pastoralna
 2004–Johna pamięci rapsod frywolny
 2004–Manewry albo Dama i huzary – liryczny poemat dźwiękowy lub dźwiękowy poemat liryczny
 2005–Ecce homo
 2005–Epitafium – zamęczonym w kamiennym piekle Gross Rosen
 2007–Epilogos
 2007–Neomobile
 2008–Larum – „Dlaboga, co się stało z Wami Żołnierze?”
 2010–Dzięcielina pałała na taśmę

References

Bibliography
 Archives of Bolesław Błaszczyk 2008;
 G. Michalski; Eugeniusz Rudnik, in: Ruch Muzyczny nr 7, 1970, 
 J. Bieniecki: Bajadery Eugeniusza Rudnika, in: Teatr Polskiego Radia, nr 1, 1997, 
 D. Mazurowski; Z E.R. rozmowa niesymetryczna, in: Estrada i Studio, nr 1, 2, 2000.
 A. Beksiak; The Erotically Audacious Electronic Eugeniusz, on: Culture.pl, November 2012. Retrieved 29-05-2014
 F. Lech; ERdada for tape – Eugeniusz Rudnik, on: Culture.pl, May 2014; retrieved 29-05-2014

Polish composers
Polish electronics engineers
Place of death missing
1932 births
2016 deaths